The Banu Sa'd ( / ALA-LC: Banū Saʿd) was one of the leading royal tribes of Arabia during the Islamic prophet Muhammad's era. They were a subgroup of the larger Hawazin tribal confederation. They had close family relations with Muhammad. They were great warriors and fought many battles with Muhammad against enemies of Islam.  Halima Sadia, Muhammad's wet nurse, belonged to this tribe. Most of them constitute the current Otaibah tribe.

Bani Saad branches

Bani Jashm 
Ghazia:

invading  And the Gazans are an independent tribe, their largest and their homes were with their people in Sarawat between Tihama and Najd, and after Islam, it spread in Iraq and the Maghreb, and the main stomachs of Gaza are:

Otaiba bin Ghazia

Jada'a bin Ghazia

Atwara bin Ghazia

Hami bin Ghazia

As for Otaiba, among them was Obaidullah bin Ramahs, Juda’a, among whom was Duraid bin Al-Samma, and Atwara, among whom was Hanak bin Thabet, the poet and the knight who participated in the cloudy day on Kinana.

Bani Asima 
They are Banu Usaima bin Jashem, and they are two branches:

Buni kaeb

Buni eaqaba

Among them is the companion of Abdullah bin Masoud, and he is Abu Al-Ahwas Awf bin Malik, and among them is the poet Rifa’a bin Darraj Al-Asmy and the companion Malik bin Nadla

Banu Nasr 
Bani Nasr branches:

Banu Auf

Banu Judima bin Auf

Banu Kelfa bin Auf

Among them is Kafr bin Harthan bin Al-Harith Al-Kalfi Al-Nasri, the narrator of the Messenger, may God’s prayers and peace be upon him, and among them is Abdah bin Hazan Al-Nasri Al-Kufi, a hadith narrator.

Banu Abbad bin Auf

Among them was Abd al-Wahed ibn Abdullah al-Abadi al-Nasri, the ruler of Medina in the days of Yazid ibn Abd al-Malik, the wali of Homs, and among them was Ziyad ibn Umair al-Abadi, a poet, Abd al-Rahman ibn Basr al-Abadi of the people of Damascus, and Subh ibn Sa`id al-Abadi of the poets of the people of Damascus.

Banu Dahman

They are the majority of Banu Nasr, in number and country, and they are divided into:

Bani Habib

They are the children of Habib bin Waelah bin Dahman bin Nasr bin Saad   Among them was Otaiba bin Al-Harith bin Modrak Al-Habibi Al-Nasri, a knight and poet who was with Hawazin on the day of Hunayn.

Banu Ghalab

They are a branch of Bani Habib and Ghalab is their grandfather, and they are Bani Al-Harith bin Aws bin Al-Nabigha bin Ater bin Habib, and they are another branch.   Among them was Khalid bin al-Ghullab, his companions and the narrator of the hadith. Khalid was in charge of the treasury of Omar bin al-Khattab, and his ruler was Othman bin Affan, Isfahan, and in the language of the siege of Uthman, then he moved from it and lived in Basra, a poet. A preacher performing the order of Dar al-Qutb in Basra, and Muhammad ibn Ghassan al-Ghalabi narrated from him by Abu al-Dunya   And Abu Umayyah Al-Ahwas bin Al-Fadl Al-Ghalabi narrated on the authority of his father, and he died in the year 300 AH in prison, and he has news

Banu Yarbue

They are the sons of Yarbu' bin Waelah bin Dahman bin Nasr bin Saad. Among them are:   Suba’i bin Rabi’a bin Mu’awiyah Al-Nasri was Subay’ on Banu Sa’d and Thaqif on the Fourth Day of Fajr, and he has verses that represent Abu Jaafar Al-Mansur.   Malik bin Auf bin Saad Al-Nasri Al-Saadi, the famous poet, the knight, the leader of Hawazin on the day of Hunayn, was a brave chief.   Aws ibn al-Hadathan al-Yarbu’i has a companionship with a hadith narrator

Banu Jail

They are the sons of Jail bin Amr bin Dahman bin Nasr bin Saad   Among them were Banu Hamas bin Zalim bin Jail, and through them the Banu Nasr Island in Egypt was known, and the Banu Hamas had a strong thorn in the land of Egypt.

References

See also
Hawazin

Hawazin
Tribes of Arabia